This is a list of electoral division results for the 2022 Australian federal election in the state of Queensland.

This election was held using instant-runoff voting.

In Queensland in this election, there were two "turn-overs"—the Australian Greens took two seats where the Greens candidate was not leading in the first count. These took place in Brisbane and Ryan.

Overall results

Results by division

Blair

Bonner

Bowman

Brisbane

Capricornia

Dawson

The sitting member, George Christensen, was elected as a Liberal National, but resigned from the party in 2022, subsequently joining One Nation. He did not contest this election and failed to win a Senate seat.

Dickson

Fadden

Fairfax

Fisher

Flynn

Forde

Griffith

Groom

Herbert

Hinkler

Kennedy

Leichhardt

Lilley

Longman

Maranoa

McPherson

Moncrieff

Moreton

Oxley

Petrie

Rankin

Ryan

Wide Bay

Wright

Results by region

Southeast

Regional

References

Queensland 2022
2022 Australian federal election